Cazaban is a Romanian surname of French origin. Notable people with the surname include:

Alexandru Cazaban, Romanian prose writer
Jules Cazaban, Romanian playwright and director
Theodor Cazaban, Romanian writer

Surnames of French origin
Romanian-language surnames